Thomas Barclay may refer to:

Thomas Barclay (scholar) ( 1570–1632), Scottish jurist, professor at Toulouse and Poitiers
Thomas Barclay (diplomat) (1728–1793), American merchant, consul, diplomat
Thomas Henry Barclay (1753–1830), New York lawyer, American loyalist, British official
Thomas Barclay (minister) (1792–1873), minister in the Church of Scotland and Principal of the University of Glasgow
Thomas Barclay (missionary) (1849–1935), British missionary to Formosa (Taiwan)
Thomas Barclay (economic writer) (1853–1941), British Liberal Party MP for Blackburn 1910
Thomas Swain Barclay (1892–1993), professor of political science at Stanford University